{{Speciesbox
| image = 
| status = LC
| status_system = IUCN3.1
| status_ref = <ref name="iucn status 11 November 2021">{{cite iucn |authors=Colli, G.R., Fenker, J., Tedeschi, L., Bataus, Y.S.L., Uhlig, V.M., Lima, A., Nogueira, C. de C., Borges-Nojosa, D.M., Costa, G.C., de Moura, G.J.B., Winck, G., Silva, J.R.S., Viñas, L.V., Ribeiro Junior, M.A., Hoogmoed, M.S., Tinôco, M.S.T., Almeida-Santos, P., Valadão, R., de Oliveira, R.B., Avila-Pires, T.C.S., Ferreira, V.L. & de Menezes, V.A. |date=2019 |title='Tropidurus cocorobensis |volume=2019|page= e.T49845536A135334524|url=https://www.iucnredlist.org/species/49845536/135334524 |access-date=16 December 2021}}</ref> 
| genus = Tropidurus
| species = cocorobensis
| authority = Rodrigues, 1987
}}Tropidurus cocorobensis'' is a species of lizard of the Tropiduridae family. It is found in Brazil.

References

Tropidurus
Reptiles described in 1987
Endemic fauna of Brazil
Reptiles of Brazil
Taxa named by Miguel Trefaut Rodrigues